Nycticeinops is a genus of vesper bat in the family Vespertilionidae. It contains the following species: 

 Bellier's serotine, Nycticeinops bellieri
 Broad-headed serotine, Nycticeinops crassulus
 Eisentraut's serotine, Nycticeinops eisentrauti
 Grandidier's serotine, Nycticeinops grandidieri
 Happolds's serotine, Nycticeinops happoldorum
 Large-headed serotine, Nycticeinops macrocephalus
 Schlieffen's serotine, Nycticeinops schlieffeni

Formerly, the only species placed in this genus was Schlieffen's serotine (N. schlieffeni), but phylogenetic evidence has placed several other species in this genus. These species were formerly classified in either Pipistrellus, Neoromicia, or Hypsugo until being reclassified into the new genus Parahypsugo in 2019. In a 2020 study, Parahypsugo was found to contain Nycticeinops, and thus both were synonymized.

References 

Nycticeinops
Bat genera
Taxa named by John Edwards Hill